Sagarmoy Ghosh (22 June 1912 – 19 February 1999) was an author and renowned editor of Bengali literary journal Desh.

Early life
Ghosh was born in Chandipur village, Comilla, in British India, His father Kalimohan Ghosh and elder brother famous singer Santidev Ghosh were closely associated with Rabindranath Tagore. Ghosh was interested in music and literature since childhood and completed his study from the school of Shantiniketan. He passed B.A from Calcutta University. In 1932, he participated in the Non-cooperation movement and was imprisoned by the police.

Career
In jail he met with Ashok Kumar Sarkar, well known editor of Ananda Bazar Patrika and joined in Anandabazar group. He became the assistant editor of Desh in 1939. Ghosh's task was to pick up young and promising writers for the magazine. He became the editor of the magazine in 1976 and for more than 5 decades he was with Ananadabazar and it's literary wings and made it an institution amongst Bengalis. A number of literary figures of Bengal contributed to the Desh magazine in his editorship. Ghosh's notable works are: Ekti Perekere Kahini, Sampadoker Boithake, Dandyakaranyar Bagh and Hirer Nakchhabi.

Awards
In 1986 he was awarded Viswa Bharati University's highest honour Deshikottam. Ghosh received Calcutta University's first Narayan Gangopadhyay award for his book Ekti Pereker Kahini. In 1984 he received Ananda Puraskar along with Sukumar Sen and Bimal Mitra.

References

1912 births
1999 deaths
Journalists from West Bengal
Indian editors
Indian magazine editors
University of Calcutta alumni
Recipients of the Ananda Purashkar
Indian writers
Indian male writers
20th-century Indian writers
20th-century Indian male writers
Bengali Hindus
Bengali writers
20th-century Bengalis
ABP Group
Indian journalists
Indian male journalists
20th-century Indian journalists
People associated with Santiniketan
Indian essayists
Indian male essayists
20th-century Indian essayists
Indian columnists
Indian short story writers
Indian male short story writers
20th-century Indian short story writers